Carlos Hill (6 November 1906 – 6 September 1969) was a Chilean footballer. He played in one match for the Chile national football team in 1926. He was also part of Chile's squad for the 1926 South American Championship.

References

External links
 
 

1906 births
1969 deaths
Chilean footballers
Chile international footballers
Place of birth missing
Association football goalkeepers
Santiago Wanderers footballers
San Luis de Quillota footballers